David Linighan (born 9 January 1965) is an English former professional footballer who played as a defender from 1982 until 2002.

He notably spent time in the Premier League with Ipswich Town, The Mighty Shrews (Division Four) and in the Scottish Premier League with Dunfermline Athletic. He also played in the Football League for Hartlepool United, Derby County, Shrewsbury Town, Blackpool, Mansfield Town and Chester City. He also had spells in Non-league with Southport and Hyde United.

Career
Linighan was born in Hartlepool, County Durham, and attended English Martyrs School. He began his career at Hartlepool United in 1982 as a 17-year-old. He remained at Victoria Park for four years, making close to 100 league appearances for the club.

After a brief spell at Derby County in 1986, he joined Shrewsbury Town for a £30,000 fee. In two years with the Shrews, Linighan made 65 league appearances, scoring one goal.

Linighan joined Ipswich Town in 1988 for £300,000. In eight years, he made a career-high 277 league appearances, scoring twelve goals, and played in the Premier League for three seasons (1992 to 1995).

In 1995, Linighan was signed by Sam Allardyce to join up with his Blackpool team. He played under three managers during his three years at Bloomfield Road, the others being Gary Megson and Nigel Worthington, scoring five goals in a century of league appearances.

Scottish club Dunfermline Athletic came in for the defender's services in 1998, and he moved north of the border for what proved to be just one game. During his time with the Pars, he was loaned to Mansfield Town, whom he would join on a permanent basis in 1999.

In 2000, Linighan moved into non-league football with Southport and Chester City, before a short spell with Hyde United in 2002 where he made eleven appearances, before retiring.

Personal life
Linighan is one of three footballing brothers, the other two being Andy and Brian. He now works as a carpenter.

Honours
Ipswich Town
Football League Second Division: 1991–92

Individual
 Ipswich Town Player of the Year: 1990–91
 Football League Second Division PFA Team of the Year: 1991–92

References

External links
 David Linighan profile at Ipswich Town Talk
 
 

1965 births
Living people
Footballers from Hartlepool
English footballers
People educated at English Martyrs School and Sixth Form College
Association football central defenders
Hartlepool United F.C. players
Derby County F.C. players
Shrewsbury Town F.C. players
Ipswich Town F.C. players
Blackpool F.C. players
Dunfermline Athletic F.C. players
Mansfield Town F.C. players
Southport F.C. players
Chester City F.C. players
Hyde United F.C. players
Premier League players
English Football League players
National League (English football) players